John Earl Simmons Jr. (June 6, 1920 – August 1, 2008) was a professional baseball and basketball player. In baseball, he was an outfielder in Major League Baseball and played for the Washington Senators in 1949. In basketball, he played for the Boston Celtics (BAA), Troy Celtics (ABL), and Schenectady Packers (NYSPL). He was the brother of professional basketball player Connie Simmons, and his son John Jr. played in the Kansas City Royals' farm system in the early 1970s.

BAA career statistics

Regular season

References

External links

1920 births
2008 deaths
American Basketball League (1925–1955) players
Baseball players from Birmingham, Alabama
Basketball players from Birmingham, Alabama
Boston Celtics players
Guards (basketball)
Major League Baseball outfielders
NYU Violets baseball players
NYU Violets men's basketball players
Washington Senators (1901–1960) players
American men's basketball players
Fond du Lac Panthers players
Amsterdam Rugmakers players
Binghamton Triplets players
Norfolk Tars players
Montreal Royals players
St. Paul Saints (AA) players
Pueblo Dodgers players
Mobile Bears players
Fort Worth Cats players
Charleston Rebels players
Montgomery Rebels players
American expatriate baseball players in Canada